Robert S. Kerr Reservoir is located within the Cookson Hills, on the Arkansas River in Sequoyah, Le Flore, Haskell, and Muskogee counties in eastern Oklahoma, US. It is about eight miles south of the nearest major town, Sallisaw, Oklahoma. The reservoir is impounded by Robert S. Kerr Lock and Dam at river mile 336.2 (km 541.1) on the Arkansas River, just a few miles below its confluence with the Canadian River. The lock and dam are part of the McClellan-Kerr Arkansas River Navigation System, which provides for barge navigation on the Arkansas River and some of its tributaries. The U.S. Army Corps of Engineers maintains the locks and navigation system.

The lock and dam were constructed by the Corps of Engineers. Prior to starting construction in 1963, the project was identified as Short Mountain Lock and Dam, but was renamed in honor of the late Oklahoma Senator, who had spent much of his political career pushing for the Arkansas River to be made navigable. The project was completed in 1970 at a cost of $94.566 million ($501 million in 2007 dollars). The dam also contains a small hydroelectric power plant with four units capable of producing a combined total of 110 megawatts.

In 2002, the I-40 bridge disaster occurred when a barge hit a bridge that carried Interstate 40 over the reservoir.

Recreation
The lake and surrounds are popular destinations for boating, fishing and hunting.  Facilities at the lake include boat ramps, picnic areas, RV and tent campsites, swimming beaches, hiking trails and concession stands.  The Army Corps of Engineers also manages over  surrounding the lake for public hunting.  Observation decks at the lake's visitors center allow guests to view barges and private watercraft as they pass through the lock system on the McClellan-Kerr Arkansas River Navigation System.

The lock, dam, and reservoir are named after Robert S. Kerr, former governor of Oklahoma and U.S. senator from Oklahoma, who died in 1963.

Gallery

References

External links
U. S. Army Corps of Engineers: Robert S. Kerr Reservoir
U. S. Army Corps of Engineers: Robert S. Kerr Lock and Dam Reservoir
 
Robert S. Kerr Reservoir information on TravelOK.com Official travel and tourism website for the State of Oklahoma.
 Oklahoma Digital Maps: Digital Collections of Oklahoma and Indian Territory

Kerr
Bodies of water of Haskell County, Oklahoma
Bodies of water of Le Flore County, Oklahoma
Bodies of water of Muskogee County, Oklahoma
Bodies of water of Sequoyah County, Oklahoma
Protected areas of Sequoyah County, Oklahoma
Protected areas of Haskell County, Oklahoma
Protected areas of Le Flore County, Oklahoma
Protected areas of Muskogee County, Oklahoma
1970 establishments in Oklahoma